Konstfack, or University of Arts, Crafts and Design, is a university college for higher education in the area of art, crafts and design in Stockholm, Sweden.

History 
Konstfack has had several different names since it was founded in 1844 by the ethnologist and artist Nils Månsson Mandelgren as a part-time art school for artisans, under the name "Söndags-Rit-skola för Handtverkare" ("Sunday Drawing School for Artisans"). The school was taken over by Svenska Slöjdföreningen (today known as Svensk form) the next year and renamed Svenska Slöjdföreningens skola.

In 1857, the first two female students (Sofi Granberg and Matilda Andersson) were accepted, and the following year female students officially were invited to apply.

It became a state school and was renamed Slöjdskolan i Stockholm (Handicraft School in Stockholm) in 1859; and in the context of a thorough reorganisation, where the school was divided into four departments in 1879, to Tekniska skolan (The Technical School). From 1945 it was known as Konstfackskolan (The school of art departments), when the institution was divided into the departments devoted to distinct disciplines that remain largely today: Textile, Decorative art, Sculpture, Ceramics, Furniture and Interior Design, Metal and Advertising and Printing. The school also obtained official status and had a two-year day school and a three-year arts and craft evening school. To this was added a two-year higher Arts and Crafts school and a three-year Art Teacher institute. It was given the status of a högskola ("university college") in 1978. From 1993 it was called just Konstfack, the short form of the name formerly used colloquially.

Long located on Norrmalm, between Klara kyrka and Hötorget, the school was in 1959 moved to a new building on Valhallavägen with well-equipped workshops, designed by architects Gösta Åberg and Tage Hertzell. In 2004, it once again moved to the former headquarters of LM Ericsson at Telefonplan in Stockholm Municipality. The 20,300-square metre interior of the old factory building was redesigned by among others architect Gert Wingårdh.

Education 

Following the standards of the Bologna process, Konstfack offers bachelor's degree programmes (3 years, 180 ECTS credits, Bachelor of Fine Arts), and master's degree programmes (2 years, 120 ECTS credits, Master of Fine Arts). There are also Art Education programmes (teacher programmes, 4,5 years and 5 years). The 2-year Animation education existed between 1996 and 2005; and was located in Eksjö.

There are seven Bachelor's Programmes :

Ceramics and Glass
Fine Art
Graphic Design and Illustration
Industrial Design
Interior Architecture and Furniture Design
Textiles
Metal Design
The Undergraduate Program is conducted in Swedish.

There are five Master's Programmes:

Craft (Dept. of Craft)
Design (Dept. of Design, Interior Architecture and Visual communications)
Fine Art (Dept. of Fine Art), and
Visual Communication (Dept. of Design, Interior Architecture and Visual Communications)
 Visual Culture and Learning

One goal of Konstfack's two-year Graduate Programmes is to attract both Swedish and international students, and the education is held mainly in English.

There is also a doctoral program given in collaboration with Royal Institute of Technology:
 Art, Technology and Design

Professional courses 
Konstfack offers courses for professionals, for example CuratorLab and Research Lab.

Departments
Konstfack has four departments: 
 Craft, 
 Design, Interior architecture and Visual communications, 
 Fine Art and  
 Department of Visual Arts and Sloyd Education.

Examinations and The Spring Exhibition
The third year of the bachelor's program and the second year of the master's includes a degree project, ten weeks at BFA-level and twenty at MFA-level, ending with a public examination and, if the student passes the examination, an exhibition for all graduating students: the Spring Exhibition (Vårutställningen in Swedish). The annual exhibition usually takes place at Konstfack during two weeks in May, with around 150 exhibiting students, and attracts thousands of visitors.
Link to the official website for the Spring Exhibition 2015 (English version).

Notable alumni
A selection of some distinguished former students at the different departments at Konstfack (Art or designer groups referred to by their collective names):

Fine Arts: 
Hilma af Klint, Cecilia Edefalk, Ingela Ihrman, Stig Lindberg (textile and ceramic designer), Annika von Hausswolff, Carl Milles, Dorinel Marc, Johanna Billing, Maria Miesenberger, Miriam Bäckström, Caroline Schlyter, Karin Mamma Andersson.

Graphic Design & Illustration: 
Carl Johan De Geer (artist and designer), Lasse Åberg (filmmaker), Brita Granström (artist and illustrator), Lotta Kühlhorn, Lars Hall (advertising), Oskar Korsár (artist and illustrator), Tuulikki Pietilä (artist), RBG6 (motion graphics), REALA, Stina Wirsén (illustrator),
Ana Biscaia, Tove Jansson (artist and illustrator).

Interior Architecture & Furniture Design: 
Claesson Koivisto Rune, Gunilla Allard, Jonas Bohlin, Mats Theselius, Stefan Borselius, Thomas Bernstrand, Greta Magnusson-Grossman.

Industrial Design: 
A & E Design, Katja Pettersson, Front (arty designers), Veryday (formerly Ergonomidesign), No Picnic, Propeller, Transformator Design.

Ceramics & Glass: 
Bertil Vallien, Per B. Sundberg, Zandra Ahl, Christian Pontus Andersson (artist).

Art Education: 
Cecilia Torudd (cartoonist), Elsa Beskow (writer and illustrator of children's books), Gert Z Nordström, Jan Stenmark (artist), Jockum Nordström (artist).

Textiles: 
Astrid Sampe, Hans Krondahl, Mah-Jong (creators of intellectual fashion in the 1960s and 1970s); Susanne Pagold (fashion journalist), 10-gruppen; Helena Hernmarck.

Metal Design: 
Vivianna Torun Bülow-Hübe, Gunnar Cyrén.

Sources

See also 
Valand School of Fine Arts
Royal University College of Fine Arts, Stockholm

External links 
 
The Spring Exhibition 2007 The website for the Spring Exhibition 2007 (English version).
The Spring Exhibition 2008 The website for the Spring Exhibition 2008.
The Spring Exhibition 2009 The website for the Master Spring Exhibition 2009.
The Spring Exhibition 2010 The website for the Spring Exhibition 2010.
The Spring Exhibition 2011 The website for the Spring Exhibition 2011.
The Spring Exhibition 2012 The website for the Spring Exhibition 2012.
The Spring Exhibition 2013 The website for the Spring Exhibition 2013.
The Spring Exhibition 2014 The website for the Spring Exhibition 2014.
The Spring Exhibition 2015 The website for the Spring Exhibition 2015.

Konstfack
University colleges in Sweden
Art schools in Sweden
Higher education in Stockholm
Culture in Stockholm
Graphic design schools
Design schools
Educational institutions established in 1844
1844 establishments in Sweden